North American Association of Methodist Schools, Colleges and Universities (NAAMSCU) is a private, not-for-profit organization of colleges and universities associated with the United Methodist Church. The UMC has more colleges, universities, theological schools and preparatory schools related to it than any other Protestant denomination, and 119 schools are currently listed as meeting the approved guidelines of the University Senate.

History 
Chartered as the National Association of Schools, Colleges and Universities of The United Methodist Church (NASCUMC) in 1976, the organization revised its mission and purpose, expanded its membership, and changed its name in 2020 under the leadership of President Scott D. Miller (also President of Virginia Wesleyan University) and Mark Hanshaw, Associate General Secretary of the General Board of Higher Education and Ministry (GBHEM).

NAAMSCU comprises 95 colleges and universities, 13 seminaries, 11 historically black institutions and several private secondary schools. Institutions are represented by the chief executive officer and chaplain.

NAAMSCU is a voluntary association of educational institutions that are related to The United Methodist Church in the United States, Canada and the Caribbean. It exists to:
Advance the work of education and scholarship in member institutions.
Work cooperatively with United Methodist conferences, boards and agencies to address issues of mutual concern to the church and the academy.
Work in partnership with the church to educate students for leadership and service to the global community.
Foster and encourage the common good of member institutions.
Strengthen the collegiality and camaraderie among member presidents, deans and heads of schools.

NAAMSCU was founded by GBHEM and is assisted by GBHEM's Division of Higher Education.  All the institutions are historically affiliated with the church and its organizations. Several institutions, but not all, are legally autonomous under their own boards of trustees and separately chartered by their respective states. The NAAMSCU seeks to enable Methodist-related educational institutions and those with a Methodist tradition to cooperate through the development of common understandings.

US member schools

US member seminaries 

The United Methodist Church maintains 13 denominational seminaries which are funded, in part, by the Methodist Ministerial Education Fund. They are listed below:

References

External links

Methodist organizations
College and university associations and consortia in the United States